Shaftesbury Films is a film, television and digital media production company founded by Christina Jennings in 1987. It is based in Toronto, Ontario, Canada.

Background 
Shaftesbury is a creator and producer of original content for television and digital platforms. Shaftesbury's slate includes 11 seasons of Murdoch Mysteries for CBC, UKTV, and ITV STUDIOS Global Entertainment; detective drama Frankie Drake for CBC; Houdini & Doyle for Sony Pictures Television, Corus Entertainment, ITV, and Fox; thriller series Slasher for NBCUniversal's Chiller and now available on Netflix; and CBC Kids series The Moblees. Shaftesbury's digital arm, Smokebomb Entertainment, produces original digital, convergent, and branded entertainment projects including the YouTube series and upcoming movie Carmilla; mystery series V Morgan Is Dead; fashion comedy series MsLabelled, produced in partnership with Shaw Media and Tetley Tea; supernatural drama Inhuman Condition; and the Slasher VR app for iOS, Android, and Oculus Rift. In June 2014, Shaftesbury partnered with Youth Culture to launch shift2, a branded entertainment agency. In 2013, the company signed a first look deal with ABC.

Productions 
Productions include Bloodletting & Miraculous Cures for HBO Canada, based on the Giller-prize winning book by Dr. Vincent Lam; five seasons of The Listener for CTV and Fox International Channels; and now in season ten of Murdoch Mysteries for Citytv/CBC and UKTV's Alibi. Shaftesbury also produced a variety of award-winning programming, including the global hit series Life with Derek and the movie follow-up to the series, Vacation with Derek. Shaftesbury's newest series, Good Dog, is a half-hour comedy created, written and directed by Ken Finkleman that premiered on HBO Canada in 2011.

Divisions 
Shaftesbury's divisions include Smokebomb Entertainment, the company's digital media division responsible for the development and production of original online series and companion web experiences for Shaftesbury's slate of properties; Shaftesbury Kids, their division responsible for several children's TV shows and movies; and Shaftesbury Sales Company, which manages international sales and distribution for the company's content.

Television

The company's television series projects have included:

 11 Cameras
 Aaron Stone
 The Atwood Stories
 Backpackers
 Baxter
 Bloodletting & Miraculous Cures
 Connor Undercover
 Dark Oracle
 Dead Still
 Fool Canada
 Frankie Drake Mysteries
 From Spain with Love with Annie Sibonney
 Good Dog
 Good God
 Houdini & Doyle
 The Jane Show
 Hudson & Rex
 Life with Derek
 The Listener
 Mischief City
 The Moblees
 Murdoch Mysteries
 Overruled!
 ReGenesis
 Screech Owls
 The Shields Stories
 Slasher
 The Sounds
 Splashlings

Film

Television films produced by Shaftesbury have included:
 External Affairs, an adaptation of Timothy Findley's play The Stillborn Lover
 Diverted
 In the Dark
 Michael Ignatieff's novel Scar Tissue
 Hemingway vs. Callaghan, an adaptation of Morley Callaghan's That Summer in Paris
 Except the Dying, Poor Tom Is Cold and Under the Dragon's Tail, the first three novels in Maureen Jennings' Murdoch Mysteries franchise which was later adapted by the company into a weekly series
 Torso: The Evelyn Dick Story, a dramatization of the murder trial of Evelyn Dick
 Terry, a biopic of Terry Fox
 six Joanne Kilbourn mysteries, based on the novels by Gail Bowen
 Eight Days To Live
 In God's Country
 Mount Pleasant
  The Good Times Are Killing Me
 Skyrunners
 Me and Luke
 The Summit
 Sleep Murder
 She Drives Me Crazy
 The Robber Bride
  Lay Them Straight 
Cinema films have included:
 Swann, based on the novel by Carol Shields,
 Conquest
 Painted Angels
 Camilla
 Long Life, Happiness & Prosperity
 People Hold On
Digital films, produced by digital arm Smokebomb Entertainment, include:
 Darken

Digital

The company's digital series projects, produced by digital arm Smokebomb Entertainment, have included:

 Backpackers
 Carmilla
 Emerald Code
 Houdini & Doyle: World of Wonders
 Inhuman Condition
 MsLabelled
 Murdoch Mysteries: The Curse of the Lost Pharaohs
 Murdoch Mysteries: The Murdoch Effect
 Murdoch Mysteries: Nightmare on Queen Street
 State of Syn
 Unlikely Heroes

The company's digital arm also oversees KindaTV, the company's distribution channel through YouTube hosted by Natasha Negovanlis.

References

External links
 Shaftesbury Films
  Shaftesbury Films About Us
 Shaftesbury Films at imdb
 Shaftesbury Films Inc. archives at the University of Toronto Media Commons

Companies based in Toronto
Mass media companies established in 1987
Film production companies of Canada
Television production companies of Canada